The Killing Lights is the first and only EP released by The Killing Lights, a side-project for Vampires Everywhere! when that band was inactive. The EP was supported by a tour in late 2014 and two singles/music videos, "Lies Spread Like Fire" and "Until I Bleed".

Track listing

Personnel

The Killing Lights
 Michael Vampire - Vocals, engineering, production
 DJ Black - Lead guitar, engineering, production
 Bryan Allan - Bass guitar
 Joshua Ingram - Drums

Additional personnel
 Erik Ron - Mixing, engineering

References

2014 EPs
Metalcore EPs
Vampires Everywhere! albums